Denmark is a country in Northern Europe. 

Denmark may also refer to:

Political entities 
 Kingdom of Denmark, a constitutional monarchy consisting of the constituent country of Denmark and two autonomous territories: the Faroe Islands and Greenland
 Denmark (European Parliament constituency), the associated constituency

Communities

Australia
 Denmark, Western Australia, a town

Canada
 Denmark, Nova Scotia
 Denmark Parish, New Brunswick

United States
 Denmark, Georgia, an unincorporated community
 Denmark, Indiana, an unincorporated community
 Denmark, Iowa, an unincorporated community and census-designated place
 Denmark, Kansas, an unincorporated community
 Denmark, Maine, a town
 Denmark, New York, a town
 Denmark, Ohio, an unincorporated community
 Denmark, Oregon, an unincorporated community
 Denmark, South Carolina, a city
 Denmark, Tennessee, an unincorporated community and former city
 Denmark, Wisconsin, a village
 Denmark Township (disambiguation)

Geographic landforms 
 Denmark River, Western Australia
 Denmark Bay, Nunavut, Canada
 Danmark Island, Greenland
 Denmark Sound, Greenland
 Denmark Strait, between Iceland and Greenland
 Lake Denmark, New Jersey, United States
 Denmark Wash, a stream in Utah, United States

People
 House of Denmark
 Denmark (name), list of people with the name

Entertainment 
 Denmark (film), a 2010 short film
 "Denmark", a song by Claire Hamill from her album Touchpaper
 "Denmark", a song by The Chemical Brothers on their album Come with Us
 Denmark, the fictional personification of the country the manga Hetalia: Axis Powers by Hidekaz Himaruya

Other uses 
 Denmark Street, London
 Denmark station, Denmark, South Carolina, United States, a train station
 Denmark (horse), racing horse

See also 
 Danmark (armoured frigate), a Danish warship (1864–1900)
 New Denmark (disambiguation)